Jeffrey LaRe (born February 9, 1976) is an American politician and law enforcement officer serving as a member of the Ohio House of Representatives from the 77th district. A Republican, LaRe's district includes the northern half of Fairfield County.

Career 
LaRe is a trained peace officer and works for a national security and asset protection service company along with his public service. He also previously served as a corrections officer.

In 2019, state Representative Tim Schaffer was appointed to the Ohio Senate, creating a vacancy for his seat. LaRe was appointed by Ohio House Republicans to serve the remainder of Schaffer's term. He was sworn into office on May 22, 2019.

2021 congressional special election 

Shortly after incumbent representative Steve Stivers announced his resignation from Congress to become president and CEO of the Ohio Chamber of Commerce, LaRe declared his candidacy for the special election to succeed him. LaRe lost the Republican primary to former coal lobbyist, Mike Carey, who received the endorsement of Donald Trump.

References

Links 
 Representative Jeff LaRe (official site)

1976 births
21st-century American politicians
Living people
Republican Party members of the Ohio House of Representatives
Candidates in the 2021 United States elections